Slavic Corridor was a term for two territorial disputes after the First World War:

Czech Corridor
Polish Corridor